The Reynolds Property is a historic country property at 514 Rocky Road in rural northeastern Botetourt County, Virginia.  It consists of  that are now mainly woodlands, with prominent limestone outcrops, and is located opposite an active limestone quarry.  The main house is a single-story stone structure, built about 1800, possibly by Thomas Newell.  The property is notable for its mid-19th century ownership by Greenville B.W. Reynolds, who owned a lime works of which only ruined remnants survive.

The property was listed on the National Register of Historic Places in 2016.

See also
 National Register of Historic Places listings in Botetourt County, Virginia

References

Houses on the National Register of Historic Places in Virginia
Houses completed in 1800
Houses in Botetourt County, Virginia
National Register of Historic Places in Botetourt County, Virginia
1800 establishments in the United States
Historic districts in Virginia